The Timberlake Formation is a geologic formation exposed in the Animas Mountains of southwestern New Mexico. Its age is estimated to be late Paleocene to Eocene.

Description
The formation is primarily limestone cobble conglomerate. The massive conglomerate beds are separated by thinner beds of sandstone, shale, claystone, and tuff. The clasts in the conglomerate are embedded in a red arkosic matrix or a poorly sorted limestone conglomerate matrix. The formation is separated from the Cowbow Springs Formation, which it strongly resembles, with angular unconformity.

The formation was deposited in the Little Hat Top basin, a downwarp on the southern flank of the Hidalgo uplift. It is overlain by the Bluff Creek Tuff, which has been radiometrically dated as 35.1 million years old. This constrains the Timberlake Formation to not be younger than Eocene. The formation is interpreted as a fanglomerate produced by erosion of early Tertiary Laramide uplifts.

History of investigation
The formation was first named by Zeller and Alper in 1965 for outcrops near Cowboy Spring in the Animas Mountains. Elston and Erb recommended merging the formation with the underlying Cowboy Spring Formation due to lack of a clear lithological distinction, but this has not been universally accepted.

Footnotes

References
 
 
 

Neogene formations of New Mexico